Cricketers from many countries entered the draft to join franchises participating in the 2015–16 season of the Bangladesh Premier League. The draft was scheduled to take place on 22 October 2015.

Player-by-choice 

Domestic players within the top three categories for the auction are listed below:

Icon players ($45,000)
The Bangladesh Premier League's governing council declared six Bangladeshi cricketers "icon players". They will earn the highest salaries ($45,000) among local players and are assigned to teams by lottery. Out of the 63 local players, the selection of the six icons came at the end of the draft.

  Tamim Iqbal
  Mashrafe Bin Mortaza
  Shakib Al Hasan
  Mahmudullah
  Mushfiqur Rahim
  Nasir Hossain

Platinum: ($200,000)
Nineteen overseas players were bought in the draft.

  Chris Gayle
  Shahid Afridi
  Misbah-ul-Haq
  Kumar Sangakkara
  Brad Hodge
  Tillakaratne Dilshan
  Shoaib Malik
  Kieron Pollard
  Darren Sammy
  Ravi Bopara
  Robin Peterson

Players' list 
List of signed players.

Pakistan 

  Ahmed Shehzad
  Wahab Riaz
  Mohammad Sami
  Nasir Jamshed
  Sohail Tanvir
  Umar Gul
  Saeed Ajmal
  Mohammed Hafeez
  Yasir Shah
  Aizaz Cheema
  Asad Shafiq
  Haris Sohail
  Imad Wasim
  Imran Farhat
  Khalid Latif
  Rana Naved-ul-Hasan
  Shahzaib Hasan
  Sarfraz Ahmed
  Mohammad Irfan
  Mohammad Talha
  Sharjeel Khan
  Mohammad Amir
  Sohaib Maqsood
  Kamran Akmal
  Umar Akmal
  Adnan Akmal
  Mukhtar Ahmed
  Taufeeq Umar
  Shabbir Ahmed
  Nauman Anwar
  Bilawal Bhatti
  Babar Azam
  Junaid Khan
  Samiullah Khan
  Zulfiqar Babar
  Younis Khan
  Faisal Iqbal
  Ashar Zaidi
  Azharullah
  Awais Zia
  Umar Amin
  Hammad Azam
  Azeem Ghumman
  Sohail Khan
  Azhar Mahmood
  Yasir Arafat
  Fawad Alam
  Khurram Manzoor
  Mohammad Asif

Sri Lanka 

  Mahela Jayawardene
  Shehan Jayasuriya
  Ajantha Mendis
  Lahiru Thirimanne
  Sachithra Senanayake
  Dilshan Munaweera
  Upul Tharanga
  Nuwan Kulasekara
  Seekkuge Prasanna
  Chamara Kapugedera
  Thisara Perera
  Jeevan Mendis

West Indies 

  Marlon Samuels
  Shivnarine Chanderpaul
  Kevon Cooper
  Samuel Badree
  Andre Russell
  Jerome Taylor
  Dinesh Ramdin
  Lendl Simmons
  Tino Best
  Sunil Narine
  Evin Lewis
  Krishmar Santokie
  Fidel Edwards
  Kemar Roach

England 

  Paul Collingwood
  Kevin Pietersen
  Darren Stevens
  Samit Patel
  Riki Wessels
  Steve Croft
  Joe Denly
  Peter Trego
  Scott Borthwick
  Max Waller
  James Tredwell
  David Payne
  Benny Howell
  Greg Smith
  Michael Richardson
  Usman Arshad
  Gordon Muchall
  Dan Redfern
  Michael Bates
  Josh Cobb
  Michael Carberry
  Laurie Evans
  Ned Eckersley
  Riki Wessels
  Graham Wagg
  Steven Mullaney
  Stephen Parry
  Chris Liddle
  George Edwards
  Jade Dernbach
  Alex Blake
  Matt Coles
  Monty Panesar
  Simon Jones
  Atif Sheikh
  Karl Brown
  Adam Riley
  Sam Billings
  Chris Jordan
  Liam Plunkett
  Dawid Malan
  Liam Dawson
  Mark Pettini
  Ajmal Shahzad
  Kishen Velani

Australia 

  James Allenby
  Steven Crook
  Shaun Tait
  Shane Harwood
  Rikki Wessels
  Aaron O'Brien
  Cameron Borgas
  Dirk Nannes
  Lee Carseldine

South Africa 

  Ryan McLaren
  Richard Levi
  Imran Tahir
  Hashim Amla
  Johan Botha
  Alfonso Thomas
  Neil Carter

Zimbabwe 

  Charles Coventry
  Elton Chigumbura
  Gary Ballance
  Malcolm Waller
  Prosper Utseya
  Vusi Sibanda
  Kyle Jarvis
  Christopher Mpofu
  Sean Ervine

Ireland 

  Gary Wilson
  Niall O'Brien
  Paul Stirling
  Kevin O'Brien

New Zealand 

  James Franklin
  James Fuller
  Jacob Oram

Netherlands 

  Ryan ten Doeschate

Sold players
List of bought players from draft.

Unsold players

  James Allenby
  Steven Crook
  Shaun Tait
  Shane Harwood
  Rikki Wessels
  Aaron O'Brien
  Cameron Borgas
  Dirk Nannes
  Lee Carseldine
  Paul Collingwood
  Kevin Pietersen
  Samit Patel
  Riki Wessels
  Jade Dernbach
  Steve Croft
  Joe Denly
  Peter Trego
  Scott Borthwick
  Max Waller
  James Tredwell
  David Payne
  Benny Howell
  Greg Smith
  Michael Richardson
  Usman Arshad
  Gordon Muchall
  Dan Redfern
  Michael Bates
  Michael Carberry
  Laurie Evans
  Ned Eckersley
  Riki Wessels
  Graham Wagg
  Steven Mullaney
  Stephen Parry
  Chris Liddle
  George Edwards
  Alex Blake
  Matt Coles
  Monty Panesar
  Simon Jones
  Atif Sheikh
  Karl Brown
  Adam Riley
  Sam Billings
  Liam Plunkett
  Liam Dawson
  Mark Pettini
  Ajmal Shahzad
  Kishen Velani
  Gary Wilson
  Niall O'Brien
  Paul Stirling
  Kevin O'Brien
  James Franklin
  James Fuller
  Jacob Oram
  Umar Gul
  Mohammed Hafeez
  Aizaz Cheema
  Asad Shafiq
  Haris Sohail
  Imran Farhat
  Khalid Latif
  Rana Naved-ul-Hasan
  Sarfraz Ahmed
  Mohammad Talha
  Sharjeel Khan
  Sohaib Maqsood
  Sohail Khan
  Adnan Akmal
  Mukhtar Ahmed
  Taufeeq Umar
  Shabbir Ahmed
  Nauman Anwar
  Bilawal Bhatti
  Babar Azam
  Junaid Khan
  Samiullah Khan
  Zulfiqar Babar
  Younis Khan
  Faisal Iqbal
  Ashar Zaidi
  Azharullah
  Awais Zia
  Umar Amin
  Hammad Azam
  Azeem Ghumman
  Azhar Mahmood
  Yasir Arafat
  Fawad Alam
  Khurram Manzoor
  Mohammad Asif
  Ryan McLaren
  Richard Levi
  Imran Tahir
  Hashim Amla
  Johan Botha
  Alfonso Thomas
  Neil Carter
  Mahela Jayawardene
  Shehan Jayasuriya
  Ajantha Mendis
  Dilshan Munaweera
  Upul Tharanga
  Chamara Kapugedera
  Shivnarine Chanderpaul
  Samuel Badree
  Jerome Taylor
  Dinesh Ramdin
  Tino Best
  Evin Lewis
  Fidel Edwards
  Kemar Roach
  Charles Coventry
  Gary Ballance
  Malcolm Waller
  Prosper Utseya
  Vusi Sibanda
  Kyle Jarvis
  Christopher Mpofu
  Sean Ervine

References

Further reading
 

2015 Bangladesh Premier League
Cricket player auction lists